Lair Point is a point projecting 570 m into Barclay Bay from Robbery Beaches on Byers Peninsula, Livingston Island in the South Shetland Islands, Antarctica and forming the east side of the entrance to Kukuzel Cove.  Dominated by Lair Hill (96 m).

The point is named descriptively from a large cave on the point used by the early 19th century sealers, relics of whose occupation were found by the Falkland Islands Dependencies Survey in 1957–58.

Location

Maps
 Península Byers, Isla Livingston. Mapa topográfico a escala 1:25000. Madrid: Servicio Geográfico del Ejército, 1992.
 L.L. Ivanov et al. Antarctica: Livingston Island and Greenwich Island, South Shetland Islands. Scale 1:100000 topographic map. Sofia: Antarctic Place-names Commission of Bulgaria, 2005.
 L.L. Ivanov. Antarctica: Livingston Island and Greenwich, Robert, Snow and Smith Islands. Scale 1:120000 topographic map.  Troyan: Manfred Wörner Foundation, 2009.  
 Antarctic Digital Database (ADD). Scale 1:250000 topographic map of Antarctica. Scientific Committee on Antarctic Research (SCAR). Since 1993, regularly upgraded and updated.
 L.L. Ivanov. Antarctica: Livingston Island and Smith Island. Scale 1:100000 topographic map. Manfred Wörner Foundation, 2017.

Gallery

References
 SCAR Composite Antarctic Gazetteer.

Headlands of Livingston Island